The 2003 BC Lions finished in fourth place in the West Division with an 11–7 record, but they made the playoffs because of the "cross-over" rule. They appeared in the East-Semi Final. The Lions wore orange alternate uniforms c. 1954 to celebrate the team's 50th season.

Offseason

CFL Draft

Preseason

Regular season

Season standings

Season schedule

Player stats

Passing

Rushing

Receiving

Awards and records
Frank Cutolo, Outstanding Rookie
Dave Dickenson, Jeff Nicklin Memorial Trophy
Steve Hardin, Tom Pate Memorial Award

2003 CFL All-Stars

Ray Jacobs, Defensive End
Geroy Simon, Slotback
Barrin Simpson, Linebacker

Western Division All-Star Selections

Eric Carter, Cornerback
Dave Dickenson, Quarterback
Ray Jacobs, Defensive End
Cory Mantyka, Offensive Tackle
Geroy Simon, Slotback
Barrin Simpson, Linebacker
Mark Washington, Safety

Playoffs

East Semi-Final

References

BC Lions seasons
BC Lions
2003 in British Columbia